Sendley Sidney Bito (born 20 July 1983 in Willemstad) is a Curaçaoan footballer.

After struggling to feature for Sparta Rotterdam's first team, Bito moved abroad for an opportunity to play professional in Ukraine. He made a strong initial impression with FC Stal Alchevsk, earning a move to FC Arsenal Kyiv, but ultimately Bito wasn't part of Arsenal's long-term plans.

References

External links
 Profile at VI 
 
 
 
 
 

1983 births
Living people
Dutch Antillean footballers
Netherlands Antilles international footballers
Curaçao footballers
Curaçao expatriate footballers
Curaçao international footballers
Sparta Rotterdam players
FC Arsenal Kyiv players
FC Stal Alchevsk players
FC Hoverla Uzhhorod players
SC Tavriya Simferopol players
Valletta F.C. players
Ukrainian Premier League players
Association football forwards
People from Willemstad
Expatriate footballers in Malta
Expatriate footballers in Ukraine
Expatriate footballers in Iran
Expatriate footballers in Bahrain
Expatriate footballers in Iraq
Expatriate footballers in Thailand
Dual internationalists (football)
SV Hubentut Fortuna players
S.V. Victory Boys players